Five ships of the Royal Navy have borne the name HMS Grappler:

 was a 12-gun  launched in 1797 and wrecked and burnt in 1803.
 was an iron paddle vessel launched in 1845 and sold in 1850.
 was a mortar vessel launched in 1855, renamed MV18 later that year, and hulked in 1866. She was sold in 1896.
 was an  launched in 1856 and sold into mercantile service in 1868.
 was a Banterer-class composite screw gunboat launched in 1880. She became a boom defence vessel in 1904 and was sold in 1907.

See also
 - a 14-gun brig belonging to the Bombay Marine of the British East India Company, launched in 1804, captured in 1806, recaptured in 1809, and that then disappears from the records.

Sources 

Royal Navy ship names